William VI of Auvergne (1096–1136) was a French count of the historically independent region of Auvergne, today in central France.

He was married to Emma, daughter of Roger I of Sicily in 1086/1087, they had issue:

 Robert III (died 1145).
 William VIII (died 1182), who married Anne of Nevers.

1096 births
1136 deaths